Płocka is a M2 metro line Warsaw Metro station in Wola district, by the intersection of Płocka and Wolska streets.

The station is 163.6 m in length, and the cubic capacity at 59 198 m³. The bronze and copper colour scheme of the station refers to the industrial history of Wola.

External links
Detailed map of  Line M2 from official Warsaw Metro site

References 

Railway stations in Poland opened in 2020
Line 2 (Warsaw Metro) stations
Wola